Pichugin (from пичуга meaning little bird) is a Russian masculine surname, its feminine counterpart is Pichugina. It may refer to
Alexey Pichugin (born 1962), former security official at the Russian oil company Yukos
Maksim Pichugin (footballer) (born 1998), Russian football player
Sergei Pichugin (born 1976), Russian football player
Serhiy Pichuhin (born 1961), Ukrainian sailor
Pichugin, Pyotr Mikhailovich (1763-04.07.1848),  Lieutenant General of Russian Imperial Army from 22.08.1826, obtained rights of hereditary nobility and personal coat of arms (coat of arms of the Pichugins granted  on  15 March, 1810)
Pichugin, Aristarkh Petrovich  (? - 13.11.1855), Major General  
Pichugin , Vsevolod Petrovich, Major General  
Pichigin,  Nicholai  Aristarkhovich (11.04.1843 - 25.05.1917) Major General since 09.04.1900, Lieutenant General 
Pichugin, Parmen Petrovich, Major General  
Pichugin, Pyotr Vsevolodovich, graduated from the Imperial School of Law, St. Petersburg, class X (13.05.1853) collegiate counsellor  
During World War II more than 980 persons of this surname fought for the Soviet Army , including:  
Pichugin Dmitri Nikolaevich (1904-1947), Hero of the Soviet Union 
Pichugin, Ivan Yakovlevich (1913-1988), Hero of the Soviet Union 
Pichugin, Ivan Pavlovich (1901-1944), Major General 
Pichugin, Nikolai Andreevich (1898-1981), Lieutenant General 
Pichugin, Nikolai Aleksandrovich (1913-1995), Order for Courage (1945), Order for Patriotic War (1985)

References